Dokumentationszentrum can refer to: 
Dokumentationszentrum Reichsparteitagsgelände Documentation Center Nazi Party Rally Grounds
Dokumentationszentrum Obersalzberg
Dokumentationszentrum Prora
Dokumentationszentrum Alltagskultur der DDR